Milesia crabroniformis is a species of flower flies or hoverflies belonging to the family Syrphidae subfamily Eristalinae.

Distribution
This species is mainly present in Belgium, France, Greece, Italy, Spain, Portugal, Switzerland, in the Near East and in North Africa.

Description

These rather uncommon hoverflies are the largest among the European species. 

They show a yellow face, reddish femurs, a yellow-brown abdomen and its wings are shaded with yellow-orange. Eyes of males are holoptic, although they meet along the dorsal length of the head in a very low point of contact. 

They mimic the hornet species Vespa crabro (hence the Latin name crabroniformis, meaning ‘hornet-formed’). It is also very similar to Volucella zonaria, a little smaller syrphid.

Biology
Adults can mainly be encountered from June through October, with a peak at the end of August. They inhabit evergreen and deciduous forests (Quercus and Fagus species), feeding on nectar of flowers of several plants (Apiaceae species, Lythrum salicaria, Mentha aquatica, Sambucus ebulus, Hedera species, Cirsium species, etc.). 

Their larvae develop on decaying wood and rotting cavities of old Fagus and Quercus species.

References

External links
 BioLib
 The world of Syrphidae
 Le jardijn de Lucie

Insects described in 1775
Taxa named by Johan Christian Fabricius
Eristalinae
Diptera of Europe
Diptera of Africa